North Todd Gentry (1866 – 1944) was a lawyer from Columbia, Missouri, who served as Missouri Attorney General and justice of the Supreme Court of Missouri. He had a lifelong law practice in Columbia and was president of the Boone County Bar. Considered an authority on local history he was active in the Boone County Historical Society. He also held membership in the Boone County Hospital Association and the Kiwanis Club. Gentry was a Freemason, Republican, and Presbyterian.

Gentry was born on March 2, 1866, the son of Thomas Benton and Mary Todd Gentry. He was the grandson of the first mayor of Columbia Richard Gentry and Ann Hawkins Gentry. He graduated from the University of Missouri with a law degree in 1888. His papers are held at the State Historical Society of Missouri. He and his wife adopted a daughter who was orphaned in a railroad accident on the Columbia Terminal Railroad. He died at age 78 on September 18, 1944, and was buried at the Columbia Cemetery.

Works
The Bench and Bar of Boone County Columbia. E.W. Stephens Publishing Company (1916)
The Writings of North Todd Gentry (published posthumously in 2011)

References

Gentry family
Missouri Attorneys General
Judges of the Supreme Court of Missouri
People from Columbia, Missouri
Lawyers from Columbia, Missouri
University of Missouri alumni
Burials at Columbia Cemetery (Columbia, Missouri)
1866 births
1944 deaths